The Napoleonic Code (lit. "Code Napoleon"), officially the Civil Code of the French (simply referred to as ), is the French civil code established during the French Consulate in 1804 and still in force, although frequently amended.

It was drafted by a commission of four eminent jurists and entered into force on 21 March 1804. The code, with its stress on clearly written and accessible law, was a major step in replacing the previous patchwork of feudal laws. Historian Robert Holtman regards it as one of the few documents that have influenced the whole world.

It was, however, the first modern legal code to be adopted with a pan-European scope, and it strongly influenced the law of many of the countries formed during and after the Napoleonic Wars. The Napoleonic Code influenced developing countries outside Europe, especially in Latin America and the Middle East, attempting to modernize and defeudalize their countries through legal reforms.

History
The categories of the Napoleonic Code were not drawn from the earlier French laws, but instead from Justinian's sixth-century codification of Roman law, the Corpus Juris Civilis, and within it, the Institutes.   The Institutes divide law into the law of:

persons
things
actions.

Similarly, the Napoleonic Code divided law into four sections:

persons
property
acquisition of property
civil procedure (moved into a separate code in 1806).

Prior codification attempts
Before the Napoleonic Code, France did not have a single set of laws; law consisted mainly of local customs, which had sometimes been officially compiled in "custumals" (coutumes), notably the Custom of Paris. There were also exemptions, privileges, and special charters granted by the kings or other feudal lords. During the Revolution, the last vestiges of feudalism were abolished.

Specifically, as to civil law, the many different bodies of law used in different parts of France were to be replaced by a single legal code. The Constituent Assembly, on 5 October 1790, voted for a codification of the laws of France, the Constitution of 1791 promised one, and the National Assembly adopted a unanimous resolution on 4 September 1791, providing that “there shall be a code of civil laws common for the entire realm.” However, it was the National Convention in 1793 which established a special commission headed by Jean-Jacques Régis de Cambacérès to oversee the drafting process. His drafts of 1793 (for which he had been given a one-month deadline), 1794, and 1796 were all rejected by a National Convention and Directory more concerned with the turmoil resulting from the various wars and strife with other European powers. The first contained 719 articles and was very revolutionary, but was rejected for being too technical and criticized for not being radical or philosophical enough. The second, with only 297 articles, was rejected for being too brief and was criticized for being a mere manual of morals. The third, expanded to 1,104 articles, was presented under the Directory, a conservative regime, but never even came up for discussion.

Another commission, established in 1799, presented that December a fourth scheme drafted in part by Jean-Ignace Jacqueminot (1754–1813). Jacqueminot's draft, the so-called loi Jacqueminot, dealt almost exclusively with persons and emphasized the need to reform the Revolutionary divorce laws, to strengthen parental authority and increase the testator's freedom to dispose of the free portion of his estate. It was, of course, rejected.

Napoleonic reforms

Napoleon set out to reform the French legal system in accordance with the ideas of the French Revolution, because the old feudal and royal laws seemed confusing and contradictory. After multiple rejected drafts by other commissions, a fresh start was made after Napoleon came to power in 1799. A commission of four eminent jurists was appointed in 1800, including Louis-Joseph Fauré and chaired by Cambacérès (now Second Consul), and sometimes by the First Consul, Napoleon himself. The Code was complete by 1801, after intensive scrutiny by the Council of State, but was not published until 21 March 1804. It was promulgated as the "Civil Code of the French" (Code civil des Français), but was renamed "the Napoleonic Code" (Code Napoléon) from 1807 to 1815, and once again after the Second French Empire.

The process developed mainly out of the various customs, but was inspired by Justinian's sixth-century codification of Roman law, the Corpus Iuris Civilis and, within that, Justinian's Code (Codex). The Napoleonic Code, however, differed from Justinian's in important ways: it incorporated all kinds of earlier rules, not only legislation; it was not a collection of edited extracts, but a comprehensive rewrite; its structure was much more rational; it had no religious content, and it was written in the vernacular.

The development of the Napoleonic Code was a fundamental change in the nature of the civil law legal system, making laws clearer and more accessible. It also superseded the former conflict between royal legislative power and, particularly in the final years before the Revolution, protests by judges representing views and privileges of the social classes to which they belonged. Such conflict led the Revolutionaries to take a negative view of judges making law.

This is reflected in the Napoleonic Code provision prohibiting judges from deciding a case by way of introducing a general rule (Article 5), since the creation of general rules is an exercise of legislative and not of judicial power. In theory, there is thus no case law in France. However, the courts still had to fill in the gaps in the laws and regulations and, indeed, were prohibited from refusing to do so (Article 4). Moreover, both the code and legislation have required judicial interpretation. Thus a vast body of case law has come into existence, but without any rule of stare decisis.

Contents of the Napoleonic Code
The preliminary article of the code established certain important provisions regarding the rule of law. Laws could be applied only if they had been duly promulgated, and then only if they had been published officially (including provisions for publishing delays, given the means of communication available at the time). Thus, no secret laws were authorized. It prohibited ex post facto laws (i.e. laws that apply to events that occurred before their introduction). The code also prohibited judges from refusing justice on grounds of insufficiency of the law, thereby encouraging them to interpret the law. On the other hand, it prohibited judges from passing general judgements of a legislative value (see above). 

With regard to family, the code established the supremacy of the husband over his wife and children, which was the general legal situation in Europe at the time. Women had even fewer rights than children. Divorce by mutual consent was abolished in 1804.

Other French codes of Napoleon's era

Military code
The Draft on Military Code was presented to Napoleon by the Special Commission headed by Pierre Daru in June 1805; however, as the War Against the Third Coalition progressed, the code was put aside and never implemented.

Criminal code
In 1791, Louis Michel le Peletier de Saint-Fargeau presented a new criminal code to the national Constituent Assembly. He explained that it outlawed only "true crimes", and not "phony offenses created by superstition, feudalism, the tax system, and [royal] despotism". He did not list the crimes "created by superstition". The new penal code did not mention blasphemy, heresy, sacrilege, witchcraft, incest or homosexuality, which led to these former offences being swiftly decriminalized. In 1810, a new criminal code was issued under Napoleon. As with the Penal Code of 1791, it did not contain provisions for religious crimes, incest or homosexuality.

Code of civil procedure
As the entire legal system was being overhauled, the new code of civil procedure was adopted in 1806.

Commercial code
The commercial code (code de commerce) was adopted in 1807.
The kernel of the commercial code is the Book III, "Of The Different Modes Of Acquiring Property", of the Napoleonic Code. It is a norm about the contracts and transactions.

Code of criminal instruction

In 1808, a code of criminal instruction (code d'instruction criminelle) was published. This code laid out criminal procedure. The parlement system, from before the Revolution, had been guilty of much abuse, while the criminal courts established by the Revolution were a complex and ineffective system, subject to many local pressures. The genesis of this code resulted in much debate. The resulting code is the basis of the modern so-called "inquisitorial system" of criminal courts, used in France and many civil law countries, though significantly changed since Bonaparte's day (especially with regard to the expansion of the rights of the defendant).

The French Revolution's Declaration of the Rights of Man and of the Citizen declared that suspects were presumed to be innocent until they had been declared guilty by a court. A concern of Bonaparte's was the possibility of arbitrary arrest, or excessive remand (imprisonment prior to a trial). Bonaparte remarked that care should be taken to preserve personal freedoms, especially when the case was before the Imperial Court: "these courts would have a great strength, they should be prohibited from abusing this situation against weak citizens without connections." However, remand still was the usual procedure for defendants suspected of serious crimes such as murder.

The possibility of lengthy remand periods was one reason why the Napoleonic Code was criticized for its de facto presumption of guilt, particularly in common law countries. Another reason was the combination of magistrate and prosecutor in one position. However, the legal proceedings did not have de jure presumption of guilt; for instance, the juror's oath explicitly required that the jury not betray the interests of the defendants and not ignore the means of defense.

The rules governing court proceedings, by today's standards, gave significant power to the prosecution; however, criminal justice in European countries in those days tended to side with repression. For instance, it was only in 1836 that prisoners charged with a felony were given a formal right to counsel, in England. In comparison, article 294 of the Napoleonic Code of Criminal Procedure allowed the defendant to have a lawyer before the Court of Assizes (judging felonies), and mandated the court to appoint a lawyer for the defendant if the defendant did not have one (failure to do so rendered the proceedings null).

Whether or not the Cour d'assises, whose task was to judge severe crimes, were to operate with a jury was a topic of considerable controversy. Bonaparte supported jury trials (or petit jury), and they were finally adopted. On the other hand, Bonaparte was opposed to the indictment jury ("grand jury" of common law countries), and preferred to give this task to the criminal division of the Court of Appeals. Some special courts were created to judge criminals who could intimidate the jury.

The French codes in the 21st century
The French codes, now more than 60 in number, are frequently amended, as well as judicially re-interpreted. Therefore, for over a century all of the codes in force have been documented in the annually revised editions published by Dalloz (Paris). These editions consist of thorough annotations, with references to other codes, relevant statutes, judicial decisions (even if unpublished), and international instruments. The "small (petit)" version of the Civil Code in this form is nearly 3,000 pages, available in print and online. Additional material, including scholarly articles, is added in the larger "expert (expert)" version and the still larger "mega (méga)" version, both of which are available in print and on searchable CD-ROM. By this stage, it has been suggested, the Civil Code has become "less a book than a database".

The sheer number of codes, together with digitisation, led the Commission supérieure de codification to reflect in its annual report for 2011:

The Commission observes that the age of drawing up new codes is probably reaching its end. The aim of a nearly complete codification of the law is no longer pursued, for three reasons: firstly, the technical developments by which texts are provided in non-physical form offer to users modes of access that are comparable in many ways to those available through a code; secondly, the creation of new codes encounters a kind of law of diminishing returns in that, the more progress that is made in the development of new codes, the trickier it becomes to determine in which code particular provisions should be located; and, finally, it is clear that certain kinds of provision [...] are unsuitable for codification, since codification makes sense only when it involves provisions that possess sufficient generality.

A year later, the Commission recommended that, after its current codification projects were completed, there should not be any further codes; an additional reason was government delay in publishing reforms that the Commission had completed. The government responded encouragingly in March 2013, but the Commission complains that this has not been followed through; in particular, that the government has abandoned its plan for a public service code (code général de la fonction publique).

Codes in other countries

Even though the Napoleonic Code was not the first civil code and did not represent the whole of his empire, it was one of the most influential. It was adopted in many countries occupied by the French during the Napoleonic Wars. In the German regions on the west bank of the Rhine (Rhenish Palatinate and Prussian Rhine Province), the former Duchy of Berg and the Grand Duchy of Baden, the Napoleonic Code was influential until the introduction of the Bürgerliches Gesetzbuch in 1900 as the first common civil code for the entire German Empire.

A number of factors have been shown by Arvind and Stirton to have had a determinative role in the decision by the German states to receive the code, including territorial concerns, Napoleonic control and influence, the strength of central state institutions, a feudal economy and society, rule by liberal (enlightened despotic) rulers, nativism (local patriotism) among the governing elites, and popular anti-French sentiment.

A civil code with Napoleonic code influences was also adopted in 1864 in Romania, and remained in force until 2011.  

The term "Napoleonic Code" is also used to refer to legal codes of other jurisdictions that are influenced by the French Code Napoléon, especially the Civil Code of Lower Canada (replaced in 1994 by the Civil Code of Quebec), mainly derived from the Coutume de Paris, which the British continued to use in Canada following the 1763 Treaty of Paris. Most of the laws in Latin American countries are also influenced on the Napoleonic Code, e.g. the Chilean Civil Code and the Puerto Rican Civil Code.

In the United States, the legal system is largely based on English common law. But the state of Louisiana is unique in having a strong influence from Napoleonic Code and Spanish legal traditions on its civil code. Spanish and French colonial forces quarreled over Louisiana during most of the 1700s, with Spain ultimately ceding the territory to France in 1800, which in turn sold the territory to the United States in 1803. The 10th Amendment to the US Constitution grants states control of laws not specifically given to the Federal government, so Louisiana's legal system retains many French elements. Examples of the practical legal differences between Louisiana and the other states include the bar exam and legal standards of practice for attorneys in Louisiana being significantly different from other states; Louisiana being the only American state to practice forced heirship of a deceased person's estate; and some of Louisiana's laws clashing with the Uniform Commercial Code practiced by the other 49 states.

References

Notes
 G. Levasseur, "Napoléon et l’élaboration des codes répressifs" in Mélanges en hommage à Jean Imbert (Paris, PUF, 1989) p. 371
 Code Pénal and Code d'Instruction Criminelle – Original French Texts and other old legislation

Further reading
 Crabb, John H., trans. The French Civil Code, revised ed. (as amended to 1 July 1994). Littleton, Colo.: Fred B. Rothman & Co.; Deventer, The Netherlands: Kluwer Law and Taxation, 1995.
 Fairgrieve, Duncan, ed. The Influence of the French Civil Code on the Common Law and Beyond. London: British Institute of International and Comparative Law, 2007.
 Fisher, H. A. L. "The Codes", in Cambridge Modern History, ed. A. W. Ward (1906). Vol. IX, pp. 148–179. An old standard scholarly summary. online free
 Halperin, Jean-Louis. The French Civil Code. Trans. Tony Weir. London: Routledge, 2006.
 Josselin, Jean-Michel, and Alain Marciano. "The Making of the French Civil Code: An Economic Interpretation". European Journal of Law and Economics 14.3 (2002): 193–203. online
 Lobingier, Charles Summer. "Napoleon and His Code". Harvard Law Rev. 32 (1918): 114+. online
 Lydorf, Claudia (2012), Romance Legal Family, EGO – European History Online, Mainz: Institute of European History, retrieved: March 25, 2021 (pdf).
 Schwartz, Bernard, ed. The Code Napoleon and the common-law world: the sesquicentennial lectures delivered at the Law Center of New York University, December 13–15, 1954 (The Lawbook Exchange, Ltd., 1998). 438 pp.
 Smithers, William W. "The Code Napoléon". American Law Register (1901): 127–147. .
 Tunc, André. "Grand Outlines of the Code Napoleon". Tulane Law Review 29 (1954): 431+.
 Tunc, André. "Husband and Wife Under French Law: Past, Present, Future". University of Pennsylvania Law Review 104 (1955): 1064+.online

External links

 Code Napoléon in French Wikipedia
 English translation of the original text
 
 Beginnings of Napoleonic Code
 Current French Text: Légifrance
"The 'Other' Little Red Book". Interview with legal historian Jean-Louis Halpérin in France Magazine.

1804 in law
1804 establishments in France
Civil codes
Law of France
Napoleon